The Great Wall Cowry, also known as the Great Wall Voleex V80, is a 5-door, 7-seat MPV made by the Chinese automaker Great Wall Motors. The styling of the Great Wall Cowry heavily resembles the Toyota Noah AZR60 (2001-2007).

Specification

It comes with a choice of 2.0L or 2.4L inline-4 petrol engines producing  and  respectively. It is powered by a front-wheel drive system, and has a 5-speed manual transmission, with automatic only with the 2.4L. The Cowry has a kerb weight of 1510 kg. From 2013 appeared new 1.5L turbo engine

It offers double sliding middle doors, double sliding moon roofs as well as GPS navigation. The Cowry is available in three versions, Comfort, Luxury, and Super Luxury. It is priced between $15,500 to $19,400.

References

Cowry
Cars introduced in 2007
Cars introduced in 2008
2010s cars
Cars of China